Alfonso John Romero (born October 28, 1967) is an American director, designer, programmer, and developer in the video game industry. He is best known as a co-founder of id Software and designer for many of their games, including Wolfenstein 3D, Dangerous Dave, Hexen, Doom, Doom II and Quake. His game designs and development tools, along with new programming techniques created and implemented by id Software's lead programmer John D. Carmack, led to a mass popularization of the first-person shooter, or FPS, in the 1990s. He is credited with coining the FPS multiplayer term "deathmatch".

Biography
Romero was born on October 28, 1967, six weeks premature in Colorado Springs, Colorado. When asked about his background, Romero claimed that "one grandparent was Yaqui, another Mexican, and another Cherokee". His mother Ginny met Alfonso Antonio Romero when they were teenagers in Tucson, Arizona. Alfonso, a first-generation Mexican American, was a maintenance man at an air force base, spending his days fixing air conditioners and heating systems. After Alfonso and Ginny got married, they headed in a 1948 Chrysler with three hundred dollars to Colorado, hoping their interracial relationship would thrive in more tolerant surroundings.

Among Romero's early influences, the arcade game Space Invaders (1978), with its "shoot the alien" gameplay, introduced him to video games. Namco's maze chase arcade game Pac-Man (1980) had the biggest influence on his career, as it was the first game that got him "thinking about game design." Nasir Gebelli (Sirius Software, Squaresoft) was his favorite programmer and a major inspiration, with his fast 3D programming work for Apple II games, such as the shooters Horizon V (1981) and Zenith (1982), influencing his later work at id Software. Other influences include programmer Bill Budge, Shigeru Miyamoto's Super Mario games, and the fighting games Street Fighter II, Fatal Fury, Art of Fighting and Virtua Fighter.

Early career

John Romero started programming games on an Apple II he got in 1980. His first developed game was a Crazy Climber clone, but it was not published. His first published game, Scout Search, appeared in the June 1984 issue of inCider magazine, a popular Apple II magazine during the 1980s. Romero's first company, Capitol Ideas Software, was listed as the developer for at least 12 of his earliest published games. Romero captured the December cover of the Apple II magazine Nibble for three years in a row starting in 1987. He entered a programming contest in A+ magazine during its first year of publishing with his game Cavern Crusader. The first game Romero created that was eventually published was Jumpster in UpTime. Jumpster was created in 1983 and published in 1987, making Jumpster his earliest created, then published, game.

Romero's first industry job was at Origin Systems in 1987 after programming games for eight years. He worked on the Apple II to Commodore 64 port of 2400 A.D., which was eventually scrapped due to slow sales of the Apple II version. Romero then moved onto Space Rogue, a game by Paul Neurath. During this time, Romero was asked if he would be interested in joining Paul's soon-to-start company Blue Sky Productions, eventually renamed Looking Glass Technologies. Instead, Romero left Origin Systems to co-found a game company named Inside Out Software, where he ported Might & Magic II from the Apple II to the Commodore 64. He had almost finished the Commodore 64 to Apple II port of Tower Toppler, but Epyx unexpectedly cancelled all its ports industrywide due to their tremendous investment in the first round of games for the upcoming Atari Lynx. During this short time, Romero did the artwork for the Apple IIGS version of Dark Castle, a port from the Macintosh. During this time, John and his friend Lane Roathe co-founded a company named Ideas from the Deep and wrote versions of a game called Zappa Roidz for the Apple II, PC and Apple IIGS. Their last collaboration was an Apple II disk operating system (InfoDOS) for Infocom's games Zork Zero, Arthur, Shogun and Journey.

1990s: id Software and Ion Storm
Romero moved to Shreveport, Louisiana in March 1989 and joined Softdisk as a programmer in its Special Projects division. After several months of helping the PC monthly disk magazine Big Blue Disk, he officially moved into the department until he started a PC games division in July 1990 named 'Gamer's Edge' (originally titled PCRcade). Romero hired John D. Carmack into the department from his freelancing in Kansas City, moved Adrian Carmack into the division from Softdisk's art department, and persuaded Tom Hall to come in at night and help with game design. Romero and the others then left Softdisk in February 1991 to form id Software.

Romero worked at id Software from its inception in 1991 until 1996. He was involved in the creation of several milestone games, including Commander Keen, Wolfenstein 3D, Doom, Doom II: Hell on Earth and Quake. He served as executive producer (and game designer) on Heretic and Hexen. He designed most of the first episode of Doom, a quarter of the levels in Quake, and half the levels in Commander Keen and Wolfenstein 3D: Spear of Destiny. He wrote many of the tools used at id Software to create their games, including DoomEd (level editor), QuakeEd (level editor), DM (for deathmatch launching), DWANGO client (to connect the game to DWANGO's servers), TED5 (level editor for the Commander Keen series, Wolfenstein 3D: Spear of Destiny), IGRAB (for grabbing assets and putting them in WAD files), the installers for all the games up to and including Quake, the SETUP program used to configure the games, and several others. In his keynote speech at WeAreDevelopers Conference 2017, Romero named this period Turbo Mode, in which he emphasizes having created 28 games, in 5.5 years with a team consisting of fewer than 10 developers.

In level 30 of Doom II, "Icon of Sin", the boss is supposed to be a giant demon head with a fragment missing from its forehead. When first viewing the demon, a distorted and demonic message is played, which is actually John Romero saying "To win the game, you must kill me, John Romero!", reversed and distorted to sound like a demonic chant. One can use the "noclip" cheat to enter the boss and see Romero's severed head which is skewered on a post. The player defeats the boss (without the noclip cheat) by shooting rockets into its exposed brain after activating a lift and riding it. Romero's head functions as its hit detection point; when he "dies", the boss is killed and the game is finished. In the 2013 IGN Doom playthrough to celebrate Doom 20th anniversary, Romero shared the backstory behind the inclusion of his head as the final boss and the reversed sound effect – they were both a result of in-joke pranking between development team members.

During the production of Quake, Romero clashed with John Carmack over the future direction of id. Romero wanted the game to follow his demanding vision without compromise, but Carmack insisted that the project had to make steady progress toward completion and accused Romero of not working as much as the other developers. Although Romero relented on his vision and joined a months-long death march effort to finish the game, this did not resolve the tensions within the company, and Romero was forced to resign. In a 1997 interview Romero reflected, "Leaving after finishing Quake was the right choice - leaving after finishing a hit game. I keep on good terms with the id guys and it was pretty easy because we've been friends for years." Carmack also reflected in 2022 saying how he regretted the way he dealt with the firing of Romero, citing immaturity and lack of understanding of corporate structure as the main reasons. He added that both he and Romero are on good terms now.

Romero later co-founded Ion Storm in Dallas, Texas with id co-worker Tom Hall, where he designed and produced Daikatana. This ambitious first-person shooter was announced in 1997 with a release date for the Christmas shopping season of that year. However, this release date slipped repeatedly in the coming months, and the game began to accrue negative press. In Spring 2010, Gamesauce featured Romero on its cover and contained an in-depth interview with Romero written by Brenda Brathwaite. In the interview, Romero publicly apologized for the infamous Daikatana advertisement. In particular, a 1997 advertisement boasting "John Romero's About To Make You His Bitch....Suck it down" caused controversy in the press and public. The massive pre-hype for the game and the subsequent delays (it was not released until April 2000) were compounded by the poor reviews the game received when it was finally complete. Upon release, Daikatana was critically panned and appeared on numerous "top 10 worst games" listings. During this time, Romero was rumored to have been killed and a photograph of his corpse with a bullet wound was also spread through the Internet; Romero himself later stated that the picture was taken for the magazine Texas Monthly, and that "maybe he shouldn't have taken it". Romero departed with Tom Hall immediately after the release of Hall's Anachronox game and the subsequent closing of the Dallas Ion office.

2000s
In July 2001, Romero and Hall founded Monkeystone Games in order to develop and publish games for mobile devices. Monkeystone released 15 games (approximately) during its short lifespan of three and a half years. Some highlights of their developments included Hyperspace Delivery Boy! (Pocket PC, Windows, Linux), Congo Cube (Pocket PC, PC, BREW, Java ME), and a version of Red Faction for the Nokia N-Gage. He and his girlfriend, Stevie Case, broke up in 2003, and she left the company in May while Red Faction development continued until October. John then left Monkeystone Games' day-to-day operations to Lucas Davis while Romero and Hall left for Midway in San Diego.

In mid-October 2003, Romero joined Midway Games as project lead on Gauntlet: Seven Sorrows. While he continued to maintain his working relationship with Monkeystone, Lucas Davis took over running the office. The Monkeystone team moved to Austin, Texas to work on Midway's Area 51 title until its release. Monkeystone Games closed down in January 2005. Romero moved from project lead to creative director of internal studio during this time. At the end of June 2005, Romero left Midway Games mere months before the completion of Gauntlet: Seven Sorrows.

On August 31, 2005, Romero confirmed that he was working on a yet-to-be-announced MMOG at his newly opened development studio, Slipgate Ironworks. It was reported that the name was temporary. "For the record," Romero wrote, "I'm co-founder of a new game company in the Bay Area and am much better off in many ways than I was at Midway". He said that he would not reveal anything about the company or the game until 2007. On March 17, 2009, it was announced that Slipgate Ironworks was part of Gazillion Entertainment. Along with venture capitalist Rob Hutter and investor Bhavin Shah, Romero was a co-founder of Gazillion. On July 22, 2006, John Romero and former co-worker Tom Hall guest hosted episode 53 of the podcast The Widget. Romero departed Gazillion Entertainment in November 2010 to form a social game company called Loot Drop alongside Brenda Brathwaite. His longtime co-worker, Tom Hall joined the company on January 1, 2011.

John Romero was the Chairman of the Board for the Cyberathlete Professional League (CPL) for ten years. On December 20, 2006, John Romero announced a new FPS project for the CPL titled Severity for both consoles and PC. It was announced that Tom Mustaine (ex-Studio Director at Ritual Entertainment) would act as Director of Game Development at CPL's new studio. It was stated that Severity would be a multiplayer first person shooter, and that the game would be built on technology licensed from id Software. On October 2009, Angel Munoz, founder of the CPL stated that Severity was no longer being produced because they were not able "to convince game publishers of its value".

2010 to present
In March 2010, John Romero collaborated with the gaming magazine Retro Gamer, taking on the role of a guest editor, taking charge of the magazine's editorial and contributing to a number of articles on different subjects throughout the magazine. The issue contains an interview by Romero with industry luminaries offering their thoughts on Romero. In August 2014, in a Super Joystiq Podcast at Gamescom 2014 Romero announced that he was about to make a new shooter, stating that he was working with a concept artist and he had some cool imagery for the main character. In April 2016, Romero announced a partnership with Adrian Carmack to create a new FPS entitled Blackroom, describing their vision as a visceral, varied and violent shooter that harkens back to classic FPS play with a mixture of exploration, speed, and intense, weaponized combat. They were seeking $700,000 via Kickstarter to see the project to completion and anticipated a launch in late 2018. The Kickstarter campaign was cancelled four days after its launch.

On 2017, Romero won the Bizkaia Award at the Fun & Serious Game Festival, which takes place in the Spanish city of Bilbao.

John Romero and his wife Brenda Romero established Romero Games on August 11, 2015. They published Gunman Taco Truck in 2017, SIGIL in 2019, and Empire of Sin in 2020.

In March 2022, in response to the 2022 Russian invasion of Ukraine, Romero created a new level of Doom II which was subsequently listed for sale through his personal website. Romero stated that all proceeds would be donated to the Ukrainian Red Cross and the UN Central Emergency Response Fund.

Personal life 

In January 2004, Romero married Raluca Alexandra Pleșca, originally from Bucharest, Romania. They divorced in 2011. Romero and game developer Brenda Brathwaite became engaged on March 24, 2012, and  married on October 27, 2012. Together, they worked on Ravenwood Fair, with Romero as Lead Designer and Brathwaite as Creative Director and Game Designer. They also founded social game development company Loot Drop in November 2010, and worked on Cloudforest Expedition and Ghost Recon Commander together. Romero has three children from two previous marriages: Michael, born in 1988, Steven born in 1989, and Lillia Antoinette, born in 1998.

Romero's long hair has been a source of both admiration and derision for his fans. John guest-answered Planet Quakes "Dear Mynx" column, in which a female fan asked for hair care tips. Romero cut his hair short in 2002 and donated it to Locks of Love. 

Discussion boards such as Doomworld and BeyondUnreal had threads discussing his new look at the time, although he began to grow it back to its original length in 2003. On January 11, 2022, Romero gave a statement via Twitter on the subject of his hair, to coincide with the 120th anniversary of William Arthur Jones' "Indian haircut order" of 1902. In the statement, Romero said: "I wear my hair long as a proud Yaqui and Cherokee man, and will continue to do so until the day I die."

In 2000, during the development of Daikatana, Romero listed Ultima V: Warriors of Destiny, Super Mario Bros. 3, Age of Empires, Duke Nukem 3D and Chrono Trigger as his favorite games of all time, with Chrono Trigger topping the list. In 2017, Romero listed World of Warcraft and Minecraft as his favorite games of all time.

Romero's favorite programming language as of 2017 is Lua.

Romero is an atheist. He also claimed that everyone involved at working on the original Doom was an atheist (although game designer Sandy Petersen is a member of The Church of Jesus Christ of Latter-day Saints).

Recognition

Games

References

Further reading

External links 

 Romero Games
 Planet Romero
 John Romero at Twitter
 

1967 births
Living people
American atheists
American expatriates in Ireland
American people of Cherokee descent
American people of Mexican descent
American people of Yaqui descent
American video game designers
American video game directors
American video game programmers
Artists from Colorado Springs, Colorado
Doom (franchise)
Id Software people
Origin Systems people
People from Dallas
Quake (series)
Wolfenstein